PFC Spartak Nalchik is a Russian association football club based in Nalchik that plays in the third-tier FNL 2. They played in the Russian Premier League between 2006 and 2012.

History
FC Spartak Nalchik was founded in 1935 and played in the regional "B-class" tournament. In 1965, Spartak won the competition and was promoted into "A-class", second group. Spartak played in that tournament from 1966 to 1970.

After reorganization of Soviet league system, Spartak played in the Soviet Second League (1971, 1977, 1978, 1981–1989) and Soviet First League (1972–1976, 1979, 1980), having been promoted and relegated several times. In 1990 and 1991 Spartak played in the Buffer League. The club's best result was a 14th position in the First League in 1974 and 1975.

The club won the title of champions of RSFSR in 1965 and 1970.

In 1992, Spartak Nalchik was entitled to enter Russian First Division. The club was relegated after the 1993 season, but earned promotion back in 1995, after two seasons spent in the Russian Second Division. From 1996 to 2005 Spartak again played in the First Division. In 2005, the team finished second and earned promotion to the Premier League. They were the leaders of Premier League between 10th and 15th rounds in 2006 season. Finally they finished 9th. They led the league again from the 3rd to 8th round in the 2010 season.

Spartak has also been known as "Automobilist" (in 1969–1972) and "Elbrus" (in 1976).

In 2011–12 season the team finished 16th and was relegated to First division.

In January 2014, Minister for Sport and Tourism of Kabardino-Balkaria announced the beginning of bankruptcy proceedings for the club. Later the same month, the Government of Kabardino-Balkaria allocated additional 61 mln roubles for the team from Republican budget.

After the 2013–14 season, the club volunteered to be relegated to the third-tier Russian Professional Football League due to lack of necessary financing for the FNL.

They won their PFL zone in the 2015–16 season and were promoted back to the FNL for the 2016–17, but stayed up only for one season before being relegated back to PFL.

Domestic history
{| class="wikitable mw-collapsible mw-collapsed" align=center cellspacing="0" cellpadding="3" style="border:1px solid #AAAAAA;font-size:90%"
|- style="background:#efefef;"
! rowspan="2" | Season
! colspan="9" | League
! rowspan="2" | Russian Cup
! colspan="2" | Top goalscorer
! rowspan="2" | Manager
|-
! Div.
! Pos.
! Pl.
! W
! D
! L
! GS
! GA
! P
! Name
! League
|-
|align=center|1992
|align=center|2nd, West
|align=center|8
|align=center|34
|align=center|16
|align=center|3
|align=center|15
|align=center|58
|align=center|47
|align=center|35
|align=center|
|align=center|Eduard Kugotov
|align=center|19
|align=center|Kazbek Tlyarugov
|-
|align=center|1993
|align=center|2nd, West
|style="text-align:center; background:pink;"|16
|align=center|42
|align=center|13
|align=center|8
|align=center|21
|align=center|52
|align=center|73
|align=center|34
|align=center|Round of 128
|align=center|Eduard Kugotov
|align=center|9
|align=center|Kazbek Tlyarugov
|-
|align=center|1994
|align=center|3rd, West
|align=center|3
|align=center|40
|align=center|28
|align=center|3
|align=center|9
|align=center|98
|align=center|33
|align=center|59
|align=center|Round of 64
|align=center|Aslan Goplachev
|align=center|29
|align=center|Yuri Naurzokov
|-
|align=center|1995
|align=center|3rd, West
|style="text-align:center; background:gold;"|1
|align=center|42
|align=center|30
|align=center|6
|align=center|6
|align=center|127
|align=center|49
|align=center|96
|align=center|Round of 256
|align=center|Oleg Kirimov
|align=center|22
|align=center|Boris Sinitsyn
|-
|align=center|1996
|align=center|2nd
|align=center|9
|align=center|42
|align=center|17
|align=center|8
|align=center|17
|align=center|62
|align=center|59
|align=center|59
|align=center|Round of 512
|align=center|Alexander Zarutsky
|align=center|13
|align=center|Viktor Kumykov
|-
|align=center|1997
|align=center|2nd
|align=center|4
|align=center|42
|align=center|23
|align=center|3
|align=center|16
|align=center|74
|align=center|53
|align=center|72
|align=center|Round of 64
|align=center|Alexander Zarutsky
|align=center|12
|align=center|Viktor Kumykov
|-
|align=center|1998
|align=center|2nd
|align=center|15
|align=center|42
|align=center|15
|align=center|11
|align=center|16
|align=center|49
|align=center|52
|align=center|56
|align=center|Round of 64
|align=center|Ali Alchagirov
|align=center|9
|align=center|Viktor Kumykov  Viktor Zernov  Aslanbek Khantsev
|-
|align=center|1999
|align=center|2nd
|align=center|13
|align=center|42
|align=center|17
|align=center|5
|align=center|20
|align=center|49
|align=center|61
|align=center|56
|align=center|Round of 256
|align=center|Vaso Sepashvili
|align=center|14
|align=center|Aslanbek Khantsev
|-
|align=center|2000
|align=center|2nd
|align=center|5
|align=center|38
|align=center|13
|align=center|9
|align=center|16
|align=center|37
|align=center|44
|align=center|48
|align=center|Round of 16
|align=center|Sergei Tsybul
|align=center|7
|align=center|Aslanbek Khantsev  Sergei Ponomaryov
|-
|align=center|2001
|align=center|2nd
|align=center|5
|align=center|34
|align=center|17
|align=center|4
|align=center|13
|align=center|48
|align=center|37
|align=center|55
|align=center|Round of 64
|align=center|Maxim Autlev
|align=center|12
|align=center|Soferbi Yeshugov
|-
|align=center|2002
|align=center|2nd
|align=center|6
|align=center|34
|align=center|14
|align=center|11
|align=center|9
|align=center|42
|align=center|30
|align=center|53
|align=center|Round of 64
|align=center|Roman Uzdenov
|align=center|12
|align=center|Soferbi Yeshugov
|-
|align=center|2003
|align=center|2nd
|align=center|15
|align=center|42
|align=center|14
|align=center|10
|align=center|18
|align=center|34
|align=center|49
|align=center|52
|align=center|Round of 16
|align=center|Anzor Dzamikhov
|align=center|9
|align=center|Soferbi Yeshugov
|-
|align=center|2004
|align=center|2nd
|align=center|12
|align=center|42
|align=center|16
|align=center|10
|align=center|16
|align=center|53
|align=center|46
|align=center|58
|align=center|Round of 64
|align=center|Anzor Kunizhev
|align=center|9
|align=center|Yuri Krasnozhan
|-
|align=center|2005
|align=center|2nd
|style="text-align:center; background:silver;"|2
|align=center|42
|align=center|25
|align=center|11
|align=center|6
|align=center|67
|align=center|36
|align=center|86
|align=center|Round of 64
|align=center|Andriy Poroshyn
|align=center|18
|align=center|Yuri Krasnozhan
|-
|align=center|2006
|align=center|1st
|align=center|9
|align=center|30
|align=center|11
|align=center|8
|align=center|11
|align=center|33
|align=center|32
|align=center|41
|align=center|Round of 32
|align=center|Serhiy Pylypchuk  Roman Kontsedalov  Eduard Korchagin
|align=center|5
|align=center|Yuri Krasnozhan
|-
|align=center|2007
|align=center|1st
|align=center|12
|align=center|30
|align=center|8
|align=center|9
|align=center|13
|align=center|29
|align=center|38
|align=center|33
|align=center|Round of 32
|align=center|Ricardo Jesus
|align=center|7
|align=center|Yuri Krasnozhan
|-
|align=center|2008
|align=center|1st
|align=center|12
|align=center|30
|align=center|8
|align=center|8
|align=center|14
|align=center|30
|align=center|39
|align=center|32
|align=center|Quarter-final
|align=center|Rustem Kalimullin
|align=center|5
|align=center|Yuri Krasnozhan
|-
|align=center|2009
|align=center|1st
|align=center|11
|align=center|30
|align=center|8
|align=center|11
|align=center|11
|align=center|36
|align=center|33
|align=center|35
|align=center|Round of 32
|align=center|Shamil Asildarov  Leandro
|align=center|8
|align=center|Yuri Krasnozhan
|-
|align=center|2010
|align=center|1st
|align=center|6
|align=center|30
|align=center|12
|align=center|8
|align=center|10
|align=center|40
|align=center|37
|align=center|44
|align=center|Round of 32
|align=center|Vladimir Dyadyun
|align=center|10
|align=center|Yuri Krasnozhan
|-
|align=center|2011–12
|align=center|1st
|style="text-align:center; background:pink;"|16
|align=center|44
|align=center|7
|align=center|13
|align=center|24
|align=center|39
|align=center|60
|align=center|34
|align=center|Round of 32
|align=center|Roman Kontsedalov
|align=center|7
|align=center|Vladimir Eshtrekov  Sergei Tashuev  Timur Shipshev
|-
|align=center|2012–13
|align=center|2nd
|align=center|3
|align=center|32
|align=center|15
|align=center|8
|align=center|9
|align=center|32
|align=center|27
|align=center|53
|align=center|Round of 32
|align=center|Igor Koronov  Aleksei Medvedev
|align=center|6
|align=center|Timur Shipshev
|-
|align=center|2013–14
|align=center|2nd
|style="text-align:center; background:pink;"|10
|align=center|36
|align=center|13
|align=center|12
|align=center|11
|align=center|36
|align=center|34
|align=center|51
|align=center|Round of 64
|align=center|Alikhan Shavayev
|align=center|5
|align=center|Shipshev  Bidzhiyev
|-
|align=center|2014–15
|align=center|3rd South
|align=center|8
|align=center|22
|align=center|7
|align=center|5
|align=center|10
|align=center|26
|align=center|27
|align=center|26
|align=center|Third round
|align=center|Magomed Guguyev
|align=center|14
|align=center|Khasanbi Bidzhiyev
|-
|align=center|2015–16
|align=center|3rd South
|style="text-align:center; background:gold;"|1
|align=center|26
|align=center|19
|align=center|6
|align=center|1
|align=center|43
|align=center|6
|align=center|63
|align=center|Round of 32
|align=center|Magomed Guguyev
|align=center|8
|align=center|Khasanbi Bidzhiyev
|-
|align=center|2016–17
|align=center|2nd
|style="text-align:center; background:pink;"|19
|align=center|38
|align=center|7
|align=center|17
|align=center|14
|align=center|26
|align=center|37
|align=center|38
|align=center|Round of 32
|align=center|
|align=center|
|align=center|Khasanbi Bidzhiyev
|-
|align=center|2017–18
|align=center|3rd South
|align=center|7
|align=center|32
|align=center|11
|align=center|11
|align=center|10
|align=center|36
|align=center|27
|align=center|44
|align=center|Round of 16
|align=center|Islam Tlupov
|align=center|9
|align=center|
|-
|align=center|2018–19
|align=center|3rd South
|align=center|6
|align=center|28
|align=center|11
|align=center|10
|align=center|7
|align=center|39
|align=center|29
|align=center|43
|align=center|Second Round
|align=center|
|align=center|
|align=center|
|-
|align=center|2019–20
|align=center|3rd South
|align=center|6
|align=center|19
|align=center|4
|align=center|7
|align=center|8
|align=center|18
|align=center|37
|align=center|19
|align=center|Third round
|align=center|Kantemir Batsev
|align=center|10
|align=center|
|}

Current squad
As of 21 February 2023, according to the official Second League website.

Notable players
Had international caps for their respective countries. Players whose name is listed in bold represented their countries while playing for Spartak.

Russia
  Viktor Fayzulin
  Zaur Khapov
  Veniamin Mandrykin
  Denis Popov
  Igor Portnyagin
  Viktor Vasin
  Artyom Yenin
  Denis Yevsikov

Former USSR countries
  Karen Grigoryan
  Hrayr Mkoyan
  Albert Sarkisyan
  Ruslan İdiqov
  Artem Kontsevoy
  Konstantin Kovalenko
  Vitali Lanko
  Aleksey Skvernyuk
  Aleksandre Amisulashvili

  Iuri Gabiskiria
  Gogita Gogua
  Giorgi Oniani
  Vaso Sepashvili
  David Siradze
  David Loria
  Kazbek Geteriev
  Arsen Tlekhugov
  Roman Uzdenov
  Aleksandrs Koliņko
  Darvydas Šernas
  Giedrius Žutautas
  Eugeniu Cebotaru
  Valeriu Ciupercă
  Viorel Frunză
  Stanislav Namașco
  Dmytro Topchiev
  Marat Bikmaev

Europe
  Ricardo Baiano
  Mario Jurić
  Adnan Zahirović
  Mark Švets
   Otto Fredrikson
  Hannes Sigurðsson
  Miodrag Džudović
  Milan Jovanović
  Darijan Matič
   Dejan Rusič

Africa
  Tiassé Koné
  Ngasanya Ilongo
  Newton Ben Katanha

Asia
  Sharif Mukhammad
  Anzour Nafash

References

External links

 Official website
 Italian Blog

 
Association football clubs established in 1935
Football clubs in Russia
Sport in Nalchik
1935 establishments in Russia
Spartak Voluntary Sports Society